BBC Nordic is a future entertainment and documentary subscription television channel featuring factual entertainment programming launching on 17 April 2023. The channel is wholly owned and operated by BBC Studios. It will replace BBC Brit and BBC Earth in the Nordic countries.

As part of the launch a dedicated streaming service, BBC Nordic+, will be available.

References

External links
 BBC Nordic Official Website

International BBC television channels
Television channels and stations established in 2023
Pan-Nordic television channels
BBC Worldwide